The following is a list of ecoregions in Lebanon as identified by the World Wide Fund for Nature (WWF).

Terrestrial
Lebanon is in the Palearctic realm. Its ecoregions are in the Mediterranean forests, woodlands, and scrub biome.
 Eastern Mediterranean conifer-sclerophyllous-broadleaf forests (also known as the Eastern Mediterranean conifer-broadleaf forests)
 Southern Anatolian montane conifer and deciduous forests

Freshwater
 Coastal Levant
 Jordan River

Marine
 Levantine Sea, part of the Mediterranean Sea marine province in the Temperate Northern Atlantic marine realm

Lebanon
 
ecoregions